= Javanese dictionaries =

Javanese dictionaries involve the Indonesian language Javanese. This is a select list.

== 1835 ==
1835 Roorda van Eysinga, P. P. (Philippus Pieter) (1835), Algemeen Nederduitsch en Javaansch woordenboek : in de Kromo- Ngoko-, Modjo- en Kawische taal, met aanhalingen uit verschillende schryvers, tot gemak van een iegelyk met italiaansch karakter, naar de Nederlandsche alphabetische volgorde, gerangschikt., K. van Hulst - Dutch and Javanese

== 1870 ==
1870 Pierre Étienne Lazare Favre (1870), Dictionnaire javanais-francais, Vienne Imprimerie impérial et royale - Javanese and France

== 1875 ==
1874 - 2nd edition, of 1845 book Gericke, J. F. C. (Johann Friedrich Carl); Roorda, T. (Taco), 1801-1874; Vreede, A. C. (Albert Cornelis), 1840-1908 (1875), Javaansch-Nederduitsch handwoordenboek : Nieuwe bewerking van het woordenboek van wijlen J. F. C. Gericke door T. Roorda [en] voortgezet, Johannes Müller - Dutch and Javanese

== 1911 ==
1911 Jansz, Pieter; Jansz, P. Ant (1913), Practisch javaansch-nederlandsch woordenboek : met latijnsche karakters, Van Dorp

== See also ==
Indonesian language
